Ray Warne was an English professional footballer who played for Ipswich Town between 1950 and 1951. A prolific striker, he scored 377 goals for Sudbury Town in twelve seasons at the club.

Signed from Leiston in 1950, Warne played 30 league matches for Ipswich, scoring 11 goals. In 1952 he signed for Sudbury Town, where he scored 51 goals in his first season as Sudbury won the Essex and Suffolk Border Football League. He then signed for Cheltenham Town, before returning to Sudbury for the 1953–54 season, when was again the club's leading scorer with 42 goals. The following season, Sudbury's first in the Eastern Counties League, he scored 47 goals. He played for Sudbury for another nine seasons, finishing as top scorer in all but three.

References

English footballers
Leiston F.C. players
Ipswich Town F.C. players
Sudbury Town F.C. players
Cheltenham Town F.C. players
2009 deaths
Year of birth missing
Association football forwards